Jerry Haldi (14 August 1935 – 8 September 2019) was an Israeli footballer and manager.

Honours

As a Player
Israeli Championship
Winner (4): 1955, 1958–59, 1959–60, 1960–61
Runner-up (4): 1955–56, 1956–57, 1957–58, 1966–68
Israel State Cup
Winner (1): 1957
Runner-up (3): 1955, 1959, 1961
Israeli Supercup
Runner-up (1): 1957
New South Wales Federation Championship
Winner (2): 1961, 1962
New South Wales Federation Cup
Winner (2): 1961, 1963

As a Manager
National Soccer League
Winner (1): 1977
Runner-up (1): 1978
NSL Manager of the Year - 1978

Personal life
Gerry Chaldi was born on 14 August 1935 in Paris, France. He had two children from his first marriage, and one child from his second marriage.  He had two grandchildren from his eldest child.

He died on 8 September 2019 after a brief illness.

References 

1935 births
2019 deaths
Footballers from Paris
Israeli footballers
Hapoel Petah Tikva F.C. players
Sydney City players
Expatriate soccer players in Australia
Expatriate soccer managers in Australia
Israeli football managers
Israeli emigrants to Australia
Jewish Israeli sportspeople
Israeli expatriates in Australia
Association football midfielders
1956 AFC Asian Cup players
Israel international footballers